Hietalahdenranta (Swedish: Sandvikskajen) is a street in the southern part of the centre of Helsinki, Finland. Like the entire Hietalahti area, the street belongs to the districts of Kamppi and Punavuori.

Hietalahdenranta begins at the Länsilinkki traffic area in Kamppi where it forms an intersection with the streets of Jätkäsaarenlaituri and Mechelininkatu. Hietalahdenranta makes a curve around the harbour pool at the end of the Hietalahti bay at the end of the Bulevardi street and ends at Punavuorenkatu, where the street line continues along Telakkakatu to the south.

There are tram tracks on Hietalahdenranta. Previously they led from Ruoholahdenranta to Bulevardi, but a new connection via Telakkakatu to Hernesaari was built in 2021.

Etymology
The name is named after the nearby bay of Hietalahti. Its Swedish name was made official in 1836 as SandviksQuain. In 1887 this was changed to Sandvikskajen which remains in use to this day. In the next year the street was split in two parts, which were named Sandviks norra kajen and Sandviks södra kajen, which got official Finnish names Hietalahden pohjoinen rantakatu and Hietalahden etelärantakatu in 1909. These streets were rejoined in 1928 and the street got its current name Hietalahdenranta.

Buildings
The buildings along the street are mainly on the eastern and northern edge where the street numbers are odd. On the side of the sea shore there is a service station at the start of the street and restaurant Merimakasiini at the other end. There are old buildings on the northern side of the harbour pool. Tenants of the buildings have included Kaj Eräjuuri's Haka-Auto, Yhtyneet Kuvalehdet and the Otava printing press. There are new buildings on the site of the dismantled Sinebrychoff building on the eastern side of the harbour pool.

Restaurant Salve was previously located at Hietalahdenranta 11 from where it moved to Hietalahdenranta 5 in autumn 2016.

References

External links
 

Streets in Helsinki
Kamppi
Punavuori